The Big Island Film Festival is a film festival held at the Mauna Lani Resort on the Kohala Coast on the Big Island of Hawaii.

The festival, which has been held every May between 2006 and 2016, features short and feature films by independent filmmakers from around the world, as well as food and beverage events, celebrities and Hawaiian music and culture.  New independent narrative films are eligible for Golden Honu Awards. Founder is Leo Sears. Currently the future of the festival is uncertain as it has not been organized for the last 3 years.

Named one of the "25 Coolest Film Festivals" in 2009 by MovieMaker Magazine.

References

External links
 Official Site

Film festivals in Hawaii
Film festivals established in 1999